The Kambuhel Formation is a geologic formation in Austria. It preserves fossils dating back to the Paleogene period.

See also 
 List of fossiliferous stratigraphic units in Austria

References

External links 
 

Geologic formations of Austria
Paleocene Series of Europe
Paleogene Austria
Danian Stage
Limestone formations
Paleontology in Austria